Phalium areola, common name the checkerboard bonnet, is a species of sea snail, a marine gastropod mollusc in the subfamily Cassinae,  within the family Cassidae the helmet and bonnet shells. It is also known as the checkerboard bonnet shell.

Distribution 
This species occurs in the Indian Ocean along Madagascar, the Mascarene Basin, Tanzania and off the southern African coast from KwaZulu-Natal and Mozambique. It can also be found in Melanesia and along Samoa.

Description
The size of an adult shell varies between 35 mm and 130 mm. 
These medium-sized shells are oval and acuminate, with a rather narrow mouth, the outer lip folded back and internally denticulate. Shoulder are not angulate nor plicate and the anterior prickles on outer lip obsolete. The surface of the shell is white with five series of large squarish red-brown spots (hence the common name). Later whorls show spiral striae anteriorly on whorls and above shoulders.

References

 Arianna Fulvo and Roberto Nistri (2005). 350 coquillages du monde entier. Delachaux et Niestlé (Paris) : 256 p.

Cassidae
Gastropods described in 1758
Taxa named by Carl Linnaeus